Theni Kunjarammal (died 18 April 2008) was an Indian actress and playback singer who has worked in the Tamil film industry. As a playback singer, she has worked extensively with A. R. Rahman during the late 1990s and early 2000s for folk songs, while also regularly collaborating with Harris Jayaraj.

Career
As an actress, Kunjarammal is best known for her roles as an old woman in a rural village, and made a breakthrough with her performance in Karuththamma (1994) as a woman who feeds insecticide to baby girls. She later reprised the role in Vivek's comedy track in Kadhal Sadugudu (2003).

Theni Kunjarammal has also worked a singer in films and has regularly collaborated with A. R. Rahman on folk songs. The duo first worked together on "Pettai Rap" from Kaadhalan (1994), and have since continued to work on albums including Muthu (1995), Taj Mahal (1999) and Sillunu Oru Kaadhal (2006). She has also worked for other composers including Ilaiyaraaja in Virumaandi (2004) and Harris Jayaraj in Arul (2004).

Personal life
In June 2006, Kunjarammal joined the political party, All India Anna Dravida Munnetra Kazhagam (AIADMK) in the presence of its general secretary Jayalalithaa. Upon her acceptance into the party, Kunjarammal performed a song for Jayalalithaa on stage.

Notable filmography
Films

Vedham Pudhithu (1987)
Pudhea Paadhai (1989)
Maruthu Pandi (1990)
Archana IAS (1991)
Amma Ponnu (1993)
Karuththamma (1994)
Thaai Manasu (1994)
Naan Petha Magane (1995)
Mannukku Mariyadhai (1995)
Bharathi Kannamma (1997)
Gopura Deepam (1997)
Rathna (1998)
Kizhakkum Merkkum (1998)
Unakkaga Ellam Unakkaga (1999)
Taj Mahal (1999)
Kushi (2000)
Budget Padmanabhan (2000)
Kadhal Sadugudu (2003)
Whistle (2003)
Jore (2004)
Virumaandi (2004)
Devathaiyai Kanden (2005)
Thirupaachi (2005)
Sivakasi (2005)
Theekuchi (2008)

Television
2004-2005 Krishna Cottage (Jaya TV)

Maya Machantra (STAR Vijay)

Notable discography

References

External links

2008 deaths
Indian women playback singers
Tamil playback singers
Tamil singers
Indian film actresses
Indian Tamil people
Actresses in Tamil cinema
20th-century Indian actresses
21st-century Indian actresses
Indian women comedians
Tamil comedians
Actresses from Tamil Nadu
Women musicians from Tamil Nadu
21st-century Indian singers
21st-century Indian women singers
20th-century Indian singers
20th-century Indian women singers
Year of birth missing